In coding theory, folded Reed–Solomon codes are like Reed–Solomon codes, which are obtained by mapping  Reed–Solomon codewords over a larger alphabet by careful bundling of codeword symbols.

Folded Reed–Solomon codes are also a special case of Parvaresh–Vardy codes.

Using optimal parameters one can decode  with a rate of R, and achieve a decoding radius of 1 − R.

The term "folded Reed–Solomon codes" was coined in a paper by V.Y. Krachkovsky with an algorithm that presented Reed–Solomon codes with many random "phased burst" errors . The list-decoding algorithm for folded RS codes corrects beyond the  bound for Reed–Solomon codes achieved by the Guruswami–Sudan algorithm for such phased burst errors.

History
One of the ongoing challenges in Coding Theory is to have error correcting codes achieve an optimal trade-off between (Coding) Rate and Error-Correction Radius. Though this may not be possible to achieve practically (due to Noisy Channel Coding Theory issues), quasi optimal tradeoffs can be achieved theoretically.

An improvement upon this  bound was achieved by Parvaresh and Vardy for rates 

For  the Parvaresh–Vardy algorithm can decode a fraction  of errors.

Folded Reed–Solomon Codes improve on these previous constructions, and can be list decoded in polynomial time for a fraction  of errors for any constant .

Definition

Consider a Reed–Solomon  code of length  and  dimension  and a folding parameter . Assume that  divides .

Mapping for Reed–Solomon codes like this:

where  is a primitive element in

.

Graphic description

Then bundling is performed in groups of 3 elements, to give a codeword of length  over the alphabet .

Something to be observed here is that the folding operation demonstrated does not change the rate  of the original Reed–Solomon code.

To prove this, consider a linear  code, of length , dimension  and distance . The  folding operation will make it a  code. By this, the rate  will be the same.

Folded Reed–Solomon codes and the singleton bound

According to the asymptotic version of the singleton bound, it is known that the relative distance , of a code must satisfy  where  is the rate of the code.  As proved earlier, since the rate  is maintained, the relative distance  also meets the Singleton bound.

Why folding might help?

Folded Reed–Solomon codes are basically the same as Reed Solomon codes, just viewed over a larger alphabet. Decoding a Reed–Solomon code and folded Reed–Solomon code for the same fraction of errors  are tasks of almost the same computational intensity: one can unfold the received word of the folded Reed–Solomon code, treat it as a received word of the original Reed–Solomon code, and run the Reed–Solomon list decoding algorithm on it. Obviously, this list will contain all the folded Reed–Solomon codewords within distance  of the received word, along with some extras, which we can expurgate.

Also, decoding a folded Reed–Solomon code is an easier task. Suppose we want to correct a third of the errors. The decoding algorithm chosen must correct an error pattern that corrects every third symbol in the Reed–Solomon encoding. This propagation of errors is indicated by the blue color in the graphical description. This proves that for a fixed fraction of errors  the folding operation reduces the channel's flexibility to distribute errors, which in turn leads to a reduction in the number of error patterns that need to be corrected.

How folded Reed–Solomon (FRS) codes and Parvaresh Vardy (PV) codes are related
We can relate Folded Reed Solomon codes with Parvaresh Vardy codes which encodes a polynomial   of degree  with polynomials  where  where  is an irreducible polynomial. While choosing irreducible polynomial  and parameter  we should check if every polynomial   of degree at most  satisfies  since  is just the shifted counterpart of  where  is the primitive element in  Thus folded RS code with bundling together code symbols is PV code of order  for the set of evaluation points

.

If we compare the folded RS code  to a PV  code  of order 2 for the set of evaluation points

unlike in the folded  FRS encoding in which it appears only once. The plus point is in choosing FRS code in a way that they are compressed forms of suitable PV code with similar error correction performance with better rate than corresponding PV code.

Brief overview of list-decoding folded Reed–Solomon codes
A list decoding algorithm which runs in quadratic time to decode FRS code up to radius  is presented by Guruswami. The algorithm essentially has three steps namely the interpolation step in which  welch berlekamp  style interpolation is used  to interpolate the non-zero polynomial

after which all the polynomials  with degree  satisfying the equation derived in interpolation are found. In the third step the actual list of close-by codewords  are known by pruning the solution subspace which takes time.

Linear-algebraic list decoding algorithm
There are three steps in this algorithm: Interpolation Step, Root Finding Step and Prune Step. In the Interpolation step it will try to find the candidate message polynomial  by solving a linear system. In the Root Finding step, it will try to find the solution subspace by solving another linear system. The last step will try to prune the solution subspace gained in the second step. We will introduce each step in details in the following.

Step 1: The interpolation step
It is a Welch–Berlekamp-style interpolation (because it can be viewed as the higher-dimensional generalization of the Welch–Berlekamp algorithm). Suppose we received a codeword  of the -folded Reed–Solomon code as shown below

We interpolate the nonzero polynomial

 

by using a carefully chosen degree parameter .

 

So the interpolation requirements will be

 

 

We have below lemma

This lemma shows us that the interpolation step can be done in near-linear time.

For now, we have talked about everything we need for the multivariate polynomial . The remaining task is to focus on the message polynomials .

Lemma 2. If a candidate message polynomial  is a polynomial of degree at most  whose Folded Reed-Solomon encoding agrees with the received word  in at least  columns with 

then  

Here "agree" means that all the  values in a column should match the corresponding values in codeword .

This lemma shows us that any such polynomial  presents an algebraic condition that must be satisfied for those message polynomials  that we are interested in list decoding.

Combining Lemma 2 and parameter , we have

Further we can get the decoding bound

We notice that the fractional agreement is

Step 2: The root-finding step

This fact is the key point that gives rise to an efficient algorithm - we can solve the linear system.

It is natural to ask how large is the dimension of the solution? Is there any upper bound on the dimension? Having an upper bound is very important in constructing an efficient list decoding algorithm because one can simply output all the codewords for any given decoding problem.

Actually it indeed has an upper bound as below lemma argues.

Lemma 3.

This lemma shows us the upper bound of the dimension for the solution space.

Finally, based on the above analysis, we have below theorem

Theorem 1. For the folded Reed–Solomon code  of block length  and rate  the following holds for all integers .

of the  codeword positions.

When ,  we notice that this reduces to a unique decoding algorithm with up to a fraction  of errors. In other words, we can treat unique decoding algorithm as a specialty of list decoding algorithm.

Theorem 1 tells us exactly how large the error radius would be.

Now we finally get the solution subspace. However, there is still one problem standing. But the actual list of close-by codewords is only a small set within that subspace. So we need some process to prune the subspace to narrow it down. This prune process takes  time in the worst case. Unfortunately it is not known how to improve the running time because we do not know how to improve the bound of the list size for folded Reed-Solomon code.

Things get better if we change the code by carefully choosing a subset of all possible degree  polynomials as messages, the list size shows to be much smaller while only losing a little bit in the rate. We will talk about this briefly in next step.

Step 3: The prune step
By converting the problem of decoding a folded Reed–Solomon code into two linear systems, one linear system that is used for the interpolation step and another linear system to find the candidate solution subspace, the complexity of the decoding problem is successfully reduced to quadratic. However, in the worst case, the bound of list size of the output is pretty bad.

It was mentioned in Step 2 that if one carefully chooses only a subset of all possible degree  polynomials as messages, the list size can be much reduced. Here we will expand our discussion.

To achieve this goal, the idea is to limit the coefficient vector  to a special subset , which satisfies below two conditions:

Condition 1. The set  must be large enough.

Condition 2.  The set  should have low intersection with any subspace  of dimension  satisfying  and  Such a subset is called  subspace-evasive subset.

During this step, as it has to check each element of the solution subspace that we get from Step 2, it takes  time in the worst case ( is the dimension of the solution subspace).

Dvir and Lovett improved the result based on the work of Guruswami, which can reduce the list size to a constant.

Here is only presented the idea that is used to prune the solution subspace. For the details of the prune process, please refer to papers by Guruswami, Dvir and Lovett, which are listed in the reference.

Summary

If we don't consider the Step 3, this algorithm can run in quadratic time. A summary for this algorithm is listed below.

See also
 Reed–Solomon error correction
 Singleton bound
 Coding theory
 List decoding

References

 Atri Rudra's Lecture Notes: Folded Reed–Solomon Codes  
 Atri Rudra's Lecture Notes: Bounds  
 A paper by Atri Rudra and Venkatesan Guruswami: Decoding Folded Reed–Solomon Codes  
 A chapter on List Decoding of folded Reed–Solomon codes: List Decoding of Folded Reed–Solomon Codes  
 Venkatesan Guruswami's lecture notes: Elementary bounds on codes  
 Venkatesan Guruswami's lecture notes: List Decoding Folded Reed–Solomon Code  
   
   
 PHD Thesis by Kristian Brander: Interpolation and List Decoding of Algebraic Codes  
 

Coding theory
Error detection and correction
Computational complexity theory